Sudirman Station (SUD, formerly Dukuh Atas Station) is a train station of KRL Commuterline, which is located in Menteng, Central Jakarta, Indonesia. The station is named from Jalan Jenderal Sudirman, one of the main avenue in Jakarta, which crosses above the station. This station is located on the north bank of West Flood Canal. Though this station serves only Commuterline trains, but it is a transit point for other types of public transportation as part of the Dukuh Atas TOD.

Distance between this station and Karet railway station is one of the shortest in the network, measuring only 0.8 km between each stations. Moreover, BNI City railway station, a station that also serves train bound for Soekarno Hatta International Airport, is wedged between Karet and Sudirman station. There is a passageway connecting Sudirman station with BNI City station and Dukuh Atas station of Jakarta MRT.

As the station is located in Jakarta's CBD and is surrounded by some of the most prominent buildings and places in Jakarta, therefore the station is always crowded, especially in rush hour.

History 
This station was formerly called Dukuh Station (DKH). However, the name of this station has changed since 2003 as the operation of the Sudirman Ekspres KRL underwent two trials in March and August 2003.

Further development plan 

In the plan to build a mass transportation line in Jakarta, Sudirman Station is planned to be the main station and the start to the Lebak Bulus Bus Terminal. Currently, Sudirman Station is connected to the Dukuh Atas BNI MRT station and intermodal stations for all types of transportation in Jakarta. Sudirman Station is also a station that is close to TransJakarta Bus rapid transit corridor 1 (Blok M-Kota), corridor 4 (Dukuh Atas 2-Pulogadung 2) and corridor 6 (Dukuh Atas 2-Ragunan). In 2022 this station is planned to be connected to the Dukuh Atas LRT station via a multi-purpose crossing bridge.

Services
The following is a list of train services at the Sudirman Station.

Passenger services 
 KAI Commuter
  Cikarang Loop Line (Full Racket)
  Cikarang Loop Line (Half Racket), to / (via  and ) and

Supporting transportation

Places of interest
 Wisma 46
 Landmark Centre
 Wisma Indocement
 Menara Astra
 Shangri-La Hotel Jakarta
 BCA Tower

References

External links

central Jakarta
Railway stations in Jakarta